Princess Marie of Baden  may refer to:
Princess Marie of Baden (1782–1808), daughter of Charles Louis, Hereditary Prince of Baden; wife of Frederick William, Duke of Brunswick-Wolfenbüttel
Princess Marie of Baden (1817–1888), daughter of Charles I, Grand Duke Prince of Baden and wife of William Hamilton, 11th Duke of Hamilton
 Princess Marie of Baden (1834–1899), daughter of Leopold, Grand Duke of Baden; wife of Ernst Leopold, 4th Prince of Leiningen
 Princess Marie of Baden (1865-1939), daughter of Prince Wilhelm of Baden and later Duchess of Anhalt as the wife of Friedrich II
Princess Marie Alexandra of Baden (1902–1944), daughter of Prince Maximilian of Baden and wife of Prince Wolfgang of Hesse, the would-be heir of the Finnish throne